The following are the appointments to various Canadian Honours of 2017. Usually, they are announced as part of the New Year and Canada Day celebrations and are published within the Canada Gazette during year. This follows the custom set out within the United Kingdom which publishes its appoints of various British Honours for New Year's and for monarch's official birthday. However, instead of the midyear appointments announced on Victoria Day, the official birthday of the Canadian Monarch, this custom has been transferred with the celebration of Canadian Confederation and the creation of the Order of Canada

However, as the Canada Gazette publishes appointment to various orders, decorations and medal, either Canadian or from Commonwealth and foreign states, this article will reference all Canadians so honoured during the 2019 calendar year.

Provincial and Territorial Honours are not listed within the Canada Gazette, however they are listed within the various publications of each provincial government. Provincial and territorial honours are listed within the page.

The Order of Canada

Extraordinary Companion of the Order of Canada
 His Royal Highness The Prince Charles, Prince of Wales, P.C., K.G., K.T., G.C.B., O.M., A.K., Q.S.O., C.C., S.O.M., C.D., A.D.C.

Companions of the Order of Canada

 Peter A. Herrndorf, C.C., O.Ont.
 The Honourable Marshall Rothstein, C.C.

Officers of the Order of Canada

 Joseph Arvay, O.C.
 Yoshua Bengio, O.C.
 Darleen Bogart, O.C.
 Abdallah S. Daar, O.C.
 Denis Daneman, O.C.
 Mary Anne Eberts, O.C.
 Richard Brian Marcel Fadden, O.C.
 Chad Gaffield, O.C.
 Sylvia Maracle, O.C.
 Mark Messier, O.C.
 Michael John Myers, O.C.
 Catherine O'Hara, O.C.
 William Siebens, O.C.
 Christine Margaret Sinclair, O.C.
 Michèle Stanton-Jean, O.C., O.Q.
 Alex Trebek, O.C.
 Hieu Cong Truong, O.C.
 Jean-Marc Vallée, O.C.
 Gloria Cranmer Webster, O.C.
 The Honourable Wayne G. Wouters, P.C., O.C.

Members of the Order of Canada

 Paul Albrechtsen, C.M., O.M.
 Bobby Baker, C.M.
 Judith G. Bartlett, C.M.
 Rod Beattie, C.M.
 Ross J. Beaty, C.M.
 René-Luc Blaquière, C.M.
 René Blouin, C.M.
 Louise Boisvert, C.M.
 Denis Boivin, C.M.
 Edwin Robert Bourget, C.M.
 Pierre Bourgie, C.M., O.Q.
 Dionne Brand, C.M.
 Geoffrey Cape, C.M.
 Chantal Caron, C.M.
 Graydon Carter, C.M.
 Meredith Chilton, C.M.
 Joyce Churchill, C.M.
 Susan Coyne, C.M.
 Susan Elizabeth Crocker, C.M.
 Cathy Crowe, C.M.
 Tracy Dahl, C.M.
 Michel Dallaire, C.M., C.Q.
 Peter B. Dent, C.M.
 Gord Downie, C.M.
 Alan Doyle, C.M.
 Nady A. el-Guebaly, C.M.
 Johnny Fay, C.M.
 The Honourable Liza Frulla, P.C., C.M., O.Q.
 Brian F. Gable, C.M.
 Lise Gaboury-Diallo, C.M.
 Emmanuelle Gattuso, C.M.
 Douglas Maitland Gibson, C.M.
 François Godbout, C.M.
 Rick Green, C.M., O.Ont.
 Salvatore Guerrera, C.M.
 Ellen Hamilton, C.M.
 Robert Keith Harman, C.M.
 Sibylla Hesse, C.M.
 Christopher House, C.M.
 Mi’sel Joe, C.M.
 Roxanne Joyal, C.M.
 Daniel Kandelman, C.M.
 Margo Kane, C.M.
 Gregory S. Kealey, C.M.
 François Mario Labbé, C.M., C.Q.
 Paul Langlois, C.M.
 Daniel Roland Lanois, C.M.
 Catherine Latimer, C.M.
 Sylvia L’Ecuyer, C.M.
 Garry M. Lindberg, C.M.
 John Macfarlane, C.M.
 Pierre Maisonneuve, C.M.
 Félix Maltais, C.M.
 Patricia Mandy, C.M.
 Michael Massie, C.M.
 Peter Gould McAuslan, C.M.
 Kim McConnell, C.M.
 Marguerite Mendell, C.M., O.Q.
 Paul Mills, C.M.
 Saeed Mirza, C.M.
 Anita Molzahn, C.M.
 George Myhal, C.M.
 Élise Paré-Tousignant, C.M., O.Q.
 Chief Terrance Paul, C.M.
 Jean Perrault, C.M., C.Q.
 André Perry, C.M.
 Jane Ash Poitras, C.M.
 Diane Proulx-Guerrera, C.M.
 Gail Erlick Robinson, C.M., O.Ont.
 Judy Rogers, C.M.
 Jacqueline Fanchette Clay Shumiatcher, C.M., S.O.M.
 John H. Sims, C.M.
 Gord Sinclair, C.M.
 Gordon J. Smith, C.M.
 William Earl Stafford, C.M.
 Bryan W. Tisdall, C.M.
 William A. Waiser, C.M., S.O.M.
 Lorne Waldman, C.M.
 Sharon Lynn Walmsley, C.M.
 Meeka Walsh, C.M.
 Bert Wasmund, C.M.
 William Price Wilder, C.M.

Order of Military Merit

Termination of appointments of the Order of Military Merit
 Warrant Officer Richard Fancy, C.D (Retired) -

Commanders of the Order of Military Merit

 Rear-Admiral Scott Edward George Bishop, C.M.M., C.D. - This is a promotion within the Order
 Major-General Christopher John Coates, C.M.M., M.S.M., C.D. - This is a promotion within the Order
 Rear-Admiral Joseph Gilles Pierre Couturier, C.M.M., C.D. - This is a promotion within the Order
 Major-General Charles Adrien Lamarre, C.M.M., M.S.C., C.D. - This is a promotion within the Order
 Major-General Denis William Thompson, C.M.M., M.S.C., C.D. - This is a promotion within the Order

Officers of the Order of Military Merit

 Major Marie Josée Brigitte Allaire, O.M.M., C.D.
 Brigadier-General Frances Jennifer Allen, O.M.M., C.D.
 Lieutenant-Colonel Holly Abigail Bernita Apostoliuk, O.M.M., C.D.
 Lieutenant-Colonel Bryan Philip Baker, O.M.M., C.D.
 Lieutenant-Colonel Joseph François Martin Barrette, O.M.M., C.D.
 Colonel Jean André Simon Bernard, O.M.M., C.D.
 Colonel Sébastien Bouchard, O.M.M., M.S.M., C.D.
 Lieutenant-Colonel Jeannot Emanuel Boucher, O.M.M., M.S.M., C.D.
 Brigadier-General Trevor John Cadieu, O.M.M., M.S.M., C.D.
 Brigadier-General James Frederick Camsell, O.M.M., M.S.M., C.D.
 Captain(N) James Allan Clarke, O.M.M., C.D.
 Lieutenant-Colonel Joseph Jean Marc Délisle, O.M.M., C.D.
 Commodore Haydn Clyde Edmundson, O.M.M., M.S.M., C.D.
 Colonel Joseph Marc Gagné, O.M.M., M.S.M., C.D.
 Lieutenant-Colonel Michael Kaiser, O.M.M., M.S.M., C.D.
 Captain(N) Josée Kurtz, O.M.M., C.D.
 Lieutenant-Colonel Shawn Blair Luckhurst, O.M.M., C.D
 Lieutenant-Colonel Thomas Joseph McNeil, O.M.M., C.D.
 Colonel Steven Masaaki Moritsugu, O.M.M., C.D.
 Captain(N) Ronald Gerald Pumphrey, O.M.M., M.S.M., C.D.
 Lieutenant-Colonel Liam Wade Rutland, O.M.M., M.S.M., C.D.

Members of the Order of Military Merit

 Petty Officer 1st Class Gordon James Abthorpe, M.M.M., C.D.
 Chief Warrant Officer Joseph Marcel Ghislain Angel, M.M.M., C.D.
 Chief Warrant Officer Wayne John Bantock, M.M.M., C.D.
 Sergeant Adam De Bartok, M.M.M., C.D.
 Captain Michael Joseph Charles Bastien, M.M.M., C.D.
 Warrant Officer Kevin Grant Beattie, M.M.M., C.D.
 Chief Warrant Officer Necole Elizabeth Belanger, M.M.M., C.D.
 Warrant Officer Vickie Lucie Benoit, M.M.M., C.D.
 Petty Officer 1st Class Yves Leonide Bernard, M.M.M., C.D.
 Lieutenant-Commander Jeffrey Biddiscombe, M.M.M., C.D.
 Lieutenant(N) Randall Milton Binnie, M.M.M., C.D.
 Master Warrant Officer Richard Joseph Rosaire Martin Bonenfant, M.M.M., C.D.
 Chief Warrant Officer John Andrew Andres Bonvie, M.M.M., M.S.M., C.D.
 Chief Warrant Officer Albert Boucher, M.M.M., C.D.
 Warrant Officer Marc Joseph Luc Boucher, M.M.M., C.D.
 Warrant Officer Marcel Yan Boursier, M.M.M., C.D.
 Sergeant Steven Leo Boyd, M.M.M., C.D.
 Warrant Officer Shaun Gary Burdeyny, M.M.M., M.S.M., C.D.
 Chief Petty Officer 2nd Class Martin David Cashin, M.M.M., C.D.
 Chief Warrant Officer Kevin Denis Colcy, M.M.M., C.D.
 Warrant Officer Joseph Émile Armand Denis Cournoyer, M.M.M., C.D.
 Chief Warrant Officer Michael Allan Davis, M.M.M., C.D.
 Warrant Officer Marie Hélène Manon Desharnais, M.M.M., C.D.
 Chief Warrant Officer David Ellyatt, M.M.M., C.D.
 Chief Warrant Officer Luc Emond, M.M.M., M.S.M., C.D.
 Master Warrant Officer Duane Wilfred Feltham, M.M.M., C.D.
 Captain Gregory Charles Forsyth, M.M.M., C.D.
 Chief Warrant Officer Paul Michael Francis, M.M.M., C.D.
 Chief Warrant Officer William Perry Fudge, M.M.M., C.D.
 Warrant Officer Omere Jules Gagne, M.M.M., C.D.
 Master Warrant Officer Vincent Ronald Gagnon, M.M.M., C.D.
 Sergeant Kim Marie Marguerite Gélinas, M.M.M., C.D.
 Master Warrant Officer Mathieu Giard, M.M.M., C.D.
 Captain Robert Bruce Grant, M.M.M., C.D.
 Master Warrant Officer Raymond Jay Green, M.M.M., C.D.
 Chief Warrant Officer Michael Charles Hamilton, M.M.M., C.D.
 Master Warrant Officer John Arthur Thomas Heffernan, M.M.M., C.D.
 Master Warrant Officer Terry Thomas Jones, M.M.M., C.D.
 Chief Warrant Officer Gabor Joseph Kato, M.M.M., C.D.
 Petty Officer 1st Class Sean Edward Roy Kelly, M.M.M., C.D.
 Petty Officer 2nd Class Jezella Kleininger, M.M.M., C.D.
 Master Warrant Officer Joseph Guy Benoit Laliberté, M.M.M., C.D.
 Captain Stephane Joseph Claude Laplante, M.M.M., C.D.
 Petty Officer 2nd Class Nicholas John Arthur LePage, M.M.M., C.D.
 Master Warrant Officer William Jack Lovely, M.M.M., C.D.
 Master Warrant Officer James MacKenzie, M.M.M., C.D.
 Chief Warrant Officer Joseph André Serge Marcotte, M.M.M., C.D.
 Chief Petty Officer 1st Class Daniel Mercier, M.M.M., C.D.
 Major Marc-André Meunier, M.M.M., C.D.
 Warrant Officer Stephen Richard Miller, M.M.M., C.D.
 Master Warrant Officer Michael Morrison, M.M.M., C.D.
 Chief Petty Officer 1st Class David Jordan Wilfred Morse, M.M.M., C.D.
 Chief Warrant Officer Jeffrey Wayne Munn, M.M.M., C.D.
 Chief Warrant Officer Joseph Paul Rémi Nault, M.M.M., C.D.
 Warrant Officer John Bernard O’Neill, M.M.M., C.D.
 Petty Officer 1st Class Scott James Osborne, M.M.M., C.D.
 Warrant Officer Guillaume Page, M.M.M., C.D.
 Ranger Levi Palituq, M.M.M., M.B., C.D.
 Chief Warrant Officer Shawn Leonard Patterson, M.M.M., C.D.
 Master Warrant Officer Brett Robert Perry, M.M.M., C.D.
 Master Warrant Officer Mark Dennis Riach, M.M.M., C.D.
 Chief Warrant Officer Stephen Arthur Rice, M.M.M., C.D.
 Warrant Officer Teresa Marie Rodden-Aubut, M.M.M., C.D.
 Sergeant Monique Ryan, M.M.M., C.D.
 Warrant Officer Karen Saunders, M.M.M., C.D.
 Chief Petty Officer 1st Class Brian Charles Schwenker, M.M.M., C.D.
 Major James Edwin Short, M.M.M., C.D.
 Chief Warrant Officer George Wayne Snider, M.M.M., C.D.
 Petty Officer 1st Class Jaime Elizabeth Stohl, M.M.M., C.D.
 Master Warrant Officer Glen Curtis Taylor, M.M.M., C.D.
 Master Warrant Officer Thomas Scott Thompson, M.M.M., C.D.
 Warrant Officer Pamela Diane Tochor, M.M.M., C.D.
 Warrant Officer Sergio Tomasi, M.M.M., C.D.
 Petty Officer 2nd Class Sarah Marie Valentine, M.M.M., C.D.
 Sergeant Marie VanAlstyne, M.M.M., C.D.
 Chief Warrant Officer Thomas Kenneth Verner, M.M.M., C.D.
 Chief Warrant Officer Joseph André Martin Walhin, M.M.M., C.D.
 Master Warrant Officer Gilbert Stephen Waye, M.M.M., C.D.
 Master Warrant Officer Scott Robbins Wilson, M.M.M., C.D.

Order of Merit of the Police Forces

Commander of the Order of Merit of the Police Forces

 Deputy Commissioner Craig Callens, O.O.M. - This is a promotion within the Order

Officers of the Order of Merit of the Police Forces

 Assistant Commissioner Joseph Peter Byron Boucher
 Chief Superintendent Scott Doran
 Superintendent Martine M. M. Fontaine
 Assistant Commissioner James Richard Douglas Gresham, M.O.M. - This is a promotion within the Order
 Chief Constable David P. Jones, M.O.M  - This is a promotion within the Order
 Inspector Thomas Brent McCluskie 
 Chief Jeffrey McGuire, M.O.M  - This is a promotion within the Order
 Chief Constable Anthony Adam Palmer, M.O.M  - This is a promotion within the Order
 Director General Martin Prud’homme 
 Constable Athanasios Stamatakis, M.O.M - This is a promotion within the Order
 Chief Superintendent John Sullivan

Members of the Order of Merit of the Police Forces

 Superintendent Cita Carmen Airth
 Staff Sergeant Jody G. Armstrong
 Superintendent Sean E. Auld
 Superintendent Richard David Baylin
 Sergeant Craig Blanchard
 Sergeant Grant S. Boulay
 Wendy Boyd
 Sergeant Kevin Alan Bracewell
 Director Pierre Brochet
 Superintendent Deanne F. Burleigh
 Staff Sergeant Paul Burnett
 Chief Superintendent John A. Cain
 Inspector Stephen Andrew Clegg
 Superintendent Derek Cooke
 Staff Sergeant Audrey Costello
 Chief Superintendent Marie Shirley Ann Cuillierrier
 Chief Superintendent Stephan J. M. Drolet
 Superintendent John Gordon Duff
 Angela Wyatt Eke
 Superintendent James Richard Faulkner
 Sergeant Robert S. Fnukal
 Staff Sergeant Robert James Fournier
 Deputy Chief Constable David Scott Green
 Chief Superintendent Christopher W. Harkins
 Staff Sergeant Penny I. Hart
 Superintendent Alison Jevons
 Sergeant Travis Erich Juska
 Corporal Brian Kerr
 Deputy Chief Officer Barry Richard Kross
 Superintendent Gary J. W. Leydier
 Superintendent Ward Clay Lymburner
 Superintendent Sean Joseph Maloney
 Staff Sergeant John Martone
 Superintendent Douglas Maynard
 Corporal Ryan Roy Mitchell
 Beverly A. Mullins
 Superintendent Dale Mumby
 Chief Superintendent Bernard L. Murphy
 Chief W. Geoffrey Nelson
 Inspector Ralph Detlev Pauw
 Chief Marlo Dean Pritchard
 Deputy Chief Constable Laurence John Rankin
 Sergeant David S. Rektor
 Superintendent Raymond Robitaille
 Staff Sergeant Maureen Rudall
 Inspector Paul Gerard Saganski
 James Scott Saunders
 Superintendent Michel Joseph Lucien Denis Saurette
 Superintendent Gary Michael Shinkaruk
 Deputy Chief Jill Mary Skinner
 Chief Superintendent Eric Ivan Stubbs
 Sergeant William Spargo Wallace
 Inspector Cindy Joyce White
 Inspector Magdi Younan

Most Venerable Order of the Hospital of St. John of Jerusalem

Knights and Dames of the Order of St. John
His Honour the Honourable J. Michel Doyon, Q.C. Québec, Que.
Roy Howard James Large, Duncan, B.C.
Jim Yuan Lai, Markham, Ont.

Commanders of the Order of St. John
 Frederica Eleonore Margarethe Gibson, Mission, B.C.
 Raymond Tze Hung Woo, Richmond Hill, Ont.
 Armand Paul LaBarge, Bethany, Ont.
 John Edgar Nadeau, Whistler, B.C.
 Joseph Bruce Varner, Ottawa, Ont.

Officers of the Order of St. John
 Jean-Pierre François Joseph Dorey, Leamington, Ont.
 Mary Elaine Heinicke, Winnipeg, Man.
 Corporal Michael James Hill, Niagara Falls, Ont.
 Edward David Hodgins, Victoria, B.C.
 Colonel Steven Craig McQuitty, Ottawa, Ont.
 Gordon James Keir Neill, Q.C., Regina, Sask.
 Adam Jack Prieur, Hamilton, Ont.
 Grant Richard Scollay, Brampton, Ont.
 Jonathan Richard Wallace, North Saanich, B.C.
 Lawrence Denis Wong, C.D., Saskatoon, Sask.
 Jason Andrew Grass, Oshawa, Ont.
 Ross Nicholls, Victoria, B.C.
 Ryan William Smith, Orton, Ont.
 Andrew Preston Wilder, M.O.M., Owen Sound, Ont.

Members of the Order of St. John 
 Maureen Shirley Batchelor, Mississauga, Ont.
 Captain Jeremiah Earl Bell, Kitchener, Ont.
 Trudie Marlene Bonbernard, Kamloops, B.C.
 Captain John David Broughton, C.D., Kelowna, B.C.
 Glenn Stephen Brown, Brantford, Ont.
 Leslie Elizabeth Bullock, Markham, Ont.
 Shaun Michael Buote, Edmonton, Alta.
 Jillean Ruth Cairns, Regina, Sask.
 Kathy Calvin, White City, Sask.
 Shane Camelford, Guelph, Ont.
 Sandra Lee Cascadden, Hatchel Lake, N.S.
 Karen Cheung, Edmonton, Alta.
 Annette Deagle, Timberlea, N.S.
 Colleen Anne Dell, Corman Park, Sask.
 Brandon Fang, Mississauga, Ont.
 Sidney René Peter Gaudry, Regina, Sask.
 Daniel Gordon Kenneth Gee, Lower Truro, N.S.
 Annette Sylvia Geldbert, Mississauga, Ont.
 Nancy Haywood, Welland, Ont.
 Karen Katherine Herzog, Edmonton, Alta.
 Tyrone Christopher Hilton, Toronto, Ont.
 Warrant Officer Jeffrey Allan Hopping, New Lowell, Ont.
 Kimberley Earlette ImBoden, Oshawa, Ont.
 Adam Janikowski, Calgary, Alta.
 Stéphane Lambert, Longueuil, Que.
 Amanda Layton-Malone, Hatchet Lake, N.S.
 Benjamin Leung, Vancouver, B.C.
 Janet Mary McGregor, Surrey, B.C.
 P. Edward Meijer, Thunder Bay, Ont.
 Mark Leslie Newman, Niagara Falls, Ont.
 Jeffrey Wai Keong Ng, Woodbridge, Ont.
 Sehar Nurpuri, Winnipeg, Man.
 Stephanie Dawn Peachey, Saskatoon, Sask.
 Serge Pellerin, Laval, Que.
 Teresa Lynn Power, Komoka, Ont.
 Margaret Mary Rose Régimbald, Edmonton, Alta.
 Jeanette Reynolds, Musquodoboit Harbour, N.S.
 Melissa Bernadette Marie Steppler, Regina, Sask.
 Mark Steven Wilkerson, Vernon, B.C.
 Bonnie Wood, Surrey, B.C.
 Frederick Yim, Vancouver, B.C.
 Romano Oseo Acconci, C.D., Burnaby, B.C.
 Tara Herd, Fergus, Ont.
 Major Christopher Matthew Hollett, C.D., Bays Bull, N.L.
 Bridget E. Jensen, Kamloops, B.C.
 Ken Ka-Him Luk, Thornhill, Ont.
 Donald Walter Maclean, Halifax, N.S.
 Jessica Elysse Marciniak, Guelph, Ont.
 William Duncan McNiece, Kamloops, B.C.
 David George Norris, St. John's, N.L.
 Jack Andrew MacPherson Peters, Winnipeg, Man.
 Lynn Diane Potts, Beeton, Ont.
 Lieutenant-Colonel (Retired) William Andrew Sergeant, O.M.M., C.D., Barrie, Ont.
 Kevin James Stinson, Guelph, Ont.
 Keith Trainor, Kamloops, B.C.
 Martin Urbanowski, Vancouver, B.C.
 Shirley Violet Edna Wellbourn, Kamloops, B.C.
 Jedd Wood, Halifax, N.S.

Provincial Honours

National Order of Québec

Grand Officers of the National Order of Québec

 L. Jacques Ménard, G.O.Q. - This is a promotion within the Order
 Hubert Reeves, G.O.Q. - This is a promotion within the Order

Officers of the National Order of Québec

 Daniel Bertolino, O.Q.
 Gilles Brassard, O.Q.
 The Honourable Irwin Cotler, P.C., O.C., O.Q.
 Francine de Montigny, O.Q.
 Michèle Fortin, O.Q.
 Jacques Montplaisir, O.Q.
 Louise Penny, O.Q.
 John R. Porter, O.Q. - This is a promotion within the Order 
 Claude Robinson, O.Q.
 Florian Sauvageau, O.Q.
 Luc Vinet, O.Q.

Honorary Officers of the National Order of Québec
 Joseph V. Melillo, O.Q.
 Peter Klaus, O.Q.
 Moshe Safdie, O.Q.
 Irina Bokova, O.Q.

Knights of the National Order of Québec

 Nahid Aboumansour, C.Q.
 Pierre Boivin, C.Q.
 Alain Chartrand, C.Q.
 Yolande Cohen, C.Q.
 Lise Cormier, C.Q.
 René Dallaire, C.Q.
 Michel de la Chenelière, C.Q.
 Paul-Arthur Fortin, C.Q.
 Serge Gauthier, C.Q.
 Jacques Girard, C.Q.
 Jacques Godin, C.Q.
 Madeleine Juneau, C.Q.
 Maria Labrecque Duchesneau, C.Q.
 Ricardo Larrivée, C.Q.
 Louise Nadeau, C.Q.
 Zebedee Nungak, C.Q.
 Jeannot Painchaud, C.Q.
 Serge Payette, C.Q.
 Carol L. Richards, C.Q.
 Jean-René Roy, C.Q.

Honorary Knights of the National Order of Québec
 The Honourable Peter Shumlin, C.Q.
 Gad Elmaleh, C.Q.

Saskatchewan Order of Merit

 Murad Al‐Katib, S.O.M.  
 June Avivi, S.O.M.  
 Martha Cole, S.O.M.  
 Roland Crowe, S.O.M.  
 Rod Gantefoer, S.O.M.  
 Paul J. Hill, C.M., S.O.M.  
 Robert D. Laing, S.O.M., Q.C.  
 Dr. Roberta McKay, S.O.M.  
 Robert Mitchell, S.O.M., Q.C. (1936‐2016) (posthumous)  
 Brigadier General (Ret’d) Clifford Walker, S.O.M., C.D.

Order of Ontario

Dr. Upton Allen  pediatric infectious disease specialist
Daniel Aykroyd  actor and entrepreneur
Dr. Alan Bernstein  cancer researcher and research leader
Dr. David Cechetto  neuroscientist and director of international medical development projects
Dr. Peter Chang  lawyer and psychiatrist
The Honourable Sandra Chapnik  lawyer and judge
Dr. Tom Chau  biomedical engineer
Dr. Dorothy Cotton  psychologist and mental health advocate
Peter Dinsdale  Anishinaabe community leader
Leslie Fagan  singer and promoter of Canadian music
Michael Geist  scholar and public intellectual
Shashi Kant   professor of forest resource economics
Myrtha Lapierre  retired nursing professor
Floyd Laughren  former MPP and Finance Minister
Michael Lee-Chin  entrepreneur and philanthropist
Gail Nyberg  former Daily Bread Food Bank executive director and former school trustee
Dr. Dilkhush Panjwani  psychiatrist
Elder Geraldine Robertson  educator and advocate for residential school survivors
Allan Rock  former politician and UN Ambassador
Robert J. Sawyer  celebrated science-fiction author
Sandra Shamas  writer, performer and comedian
Elizabeth Sheehy  criminal law, scholar
Ilse Treurnicht   CEO and advocate for women and innovation

Order of British Columbia

 Tim Manning
 Paul Myers
 Neil J. Sterritt
 Wally Oppal
 Dr. Stanley W. Hamilton
 James Byrnes
 Sarah Morgan-Silvester 
 Dr. Roslyn Kunin
 Dr. Roslyn Louise Harrison 
 Elaine Carty
 Wendy Morton
 Jennifer Wade
 Joseph James Arvay
 Dr. Gary Birch
 Lance S.G. Finch
 Dr. Jiri Frohlich

Alberta Order of Excellence

 Steve Allan
 Gary Bowie
 Anne Fanning Binder
 Marie Gordon
 James Holland
 Steve Hrudey
 Vivian Manasc
 David Werklund

Order of Prince Edward Island

Order of Manitoba

 David Angus
 Marlene Bertrand
 Doreen Brownstone
 Selwyn Burrows
 Philipp R. Ens
 Anne Lindsey
 Lisa Meeches
 The Honourable Reynaldo Pagtakhan
 Phillip Peebles
 Robert Picken
 Paul Robson
 Beverly Suek

Order of New Brunswick

 Normand Caissie
 Susan Chalmers-Gauvin
 Erminie J. Cohen, C.M.
 Richard J. Currie, O.C.
 Raimo (Ray) Kokkonen, C.D.
 Donat Lacroix
 Dr. Michael Perley
 Léopold Thériault
 Jacqueline Webster

Order of Nova Scotia

 Bradford J. Barton, C.M., O.N.S.
 Geraldine Marjorie Browning, O.N.S., DHum (Hon.)
 R. Irene d’Entremont, C.M., O.N.S., D.Comm. (Hon.)
Ray Ivany, O.N.S., M.S., D.Law (Hon.)
 Peter J. M. Nicholson, C.M., O.N.S., PhD.

Order of Newfoundland and Labrador

 Marie Ryan
 Terence Goodyear
 Kathleen Pratt LeGrow
 Frederick David Smallwood 
 Robert Mellin
 Wayne Miller
 Dr. Falah Maroun
 Katarina Roxon

Territorial Honours

Order of Nunavut

 Betty Brewster
 Ludy Pudluk

Order of the Northwest Territories

 Paul Andrew
 Fred Carmichael
 Russell King
 Linda Koe
 Jeff Philipp
 Tom Zubko

Canadian Bravery Decorations

Star of Courage

 John W. Gallie (deceased)
 Liam Bernard, S.C.
 Sebastian Taborszky, S.C.

Medal of Bravery
 

 Ronald James Andersen
 Petty Officer First Class André Aubry, C.D.
 Hichem Ayoub
 Juergen Baetzel
 Constable Craig Barker
 Jean-François Bouchard
 Constable Robert Conant
 Constable Steve Demers
 Corporal Alisha Dawn Fisher
 Special Constable Joshua Ford
 Barry Gateman
 Helen Anne Goulet
 Daniel Patrick Greene
 Brant Hannah
 John Fawcett Vernon Hewitt
 Paul Hindson
 Constable Paul Hykaway
 Arliss Jackson
 Tobias MacDonald
 Daniel Maisonneuve
 Constable Michael McGee
 Stéphane Ouellette
 Constable Samuel Poirier-Payette
 Constable Blake Pyatt
 Stuart Rostant
 Marc Savoie
 Gregory Swan
 James Sylvest
 Adam James Tarnowski
 Sylvain Tremblay
 Carol Van Ruymbeke
 Dale Gary Woloshyn
 Samson Aboegbulem, M.B.
 John Allison, M.B.
 Samir Al-Rubaiy, M.B.
 Abdul Ayoola, M.B.
 James Badgley, M.B.
 Constable Daniel Bassi, M.B.
 Sergeant Stephen Claude Joseph Bates, M.B., C.D.
 Steeve Bordeleau, M.B.
 Constable Jacob Braun, M.B.
 Sergeant Stéphane Champagne, M.B.
 Anne Michelle Curtis, M.B. (posthumous)
 Lieutenant (N) Samuel Gaudreault, M.B., C.D.
 John Gorman, M.B.
 Dean Ingram, M.B.
 Constable Zoran Ivkovic, M.B.
 Private Matthew Thomas Lepain, M.B.
 Darren Life, M.B.
 Leading Seaman Jean-François Martineau, M.B.
 Jim Mascioli, M.B.
 John McDonald, M.B.
 Russell Montell, M.B.
 Constable Stephanie Pelley, M.B.
 Able Seaman James Richards, M.B.
 Constable Neal Ridley, M.B.
 Constable Allan Rivet, M.B.
 Sergeant Jean-Marc Rochon, M.B.
 Daniel Roy, M.B.
 Leon Slaney, M.B.
 Don Smith, M.B.
 Calvin Stein, M.B.
 Robert Stokes, M.B.
 Vince Teddy, M.B.
 Constable Charlie Torres, M.B.
 Constable Andrew Vickers, M.B.
 Lieutenant (N) Daniel Willis, M.B.
 Corporal Alexander Edward Zawyrucha, M.B.
 Master Corporal Bryan Gagne, M.B., C.D.

Meritorious Service Decorations

Meritorious Service Cross (Military Division)

 Colonel Joseph Raoul Stéphane Boivin, M.S.C., C.D.
 Colonel David Elder, M.S.C., A.M.

Meritorious Service Cross (Civil Division)

 Daniel Alfredsson, M.S.C.
 Alethea Aggiuq Arnaquq-Baril, M.S.C.
 Robert Edward Burrell, M.S.C.
 Jennifer Coghlan, M.S.C.
 Nicholas Iain Coghlan, M.S.C.
 Teresa Barbara Dellar, M.S.C.
 Jessica DiSabatino, M.S.C.
 Robert David Ellis, M.S.C.
 Heinrich Ulrich Feldmann, M.S.C.
 Peter Michael Ford, M.S.C.
 Judy L. Graves, M.S.C.
 Michael Kaufman, M.S.C.
 Gary P. Kobinger, O.M., M.S.C.
 The Honourable Jack Layton, P.C., M.S.C. (posthumous)
 Ting Yim Lee, M.S.C.
 Monique Lefebvre, M.S.C.
 Joseph Maloney, M.S.C.
 Norman J. Rolston, O.B.C., M.S.C., C.D.
 Nicole Rycroft, M.S.C.
 Ronald Sluser, M.S.C.
 Mark Vincent Wafer, M.S.C.
 Ron Abrahams, M.S.C.
 John Allan Baker, M.S.C.
 A. Lynne Beal, M.S.C.
 Dan Bigras, M.S.C.
 Pierre Bouvier, M.S.C.
 Tom Chau, M.S.C.
 Sandra Elizabeth Clarke, M.S.C.
 Charles-André Comeau, M.S.C.
 Michel Côté, M.S.C.
 David Desrosiers, M.S.C.
 Pierre Duez, M.S.C.
 Christine J. Elliott, M.S.C.
 The Honourable James M. Flaherty, P.C., M.S.C. (posthumous)
 Marcel Gauthier, M.S.C.
 Aileen Gleason, M.S.C.
 Sandra Lynn Hanington, M.S.C.
 Daniel Y. C. Heng, M.S.C.
 Peg Herbert, M.S.C.
 Madeleine Juneau, M.S.C.
 Andrea Lorraine Lamont, M.S.C.
 Sébastien Lefebvre, M.S.C.
 J. Wilton Littlechild, C.M., A.O.E., M.S.C., Q.C.
 Justin Maloney, M.S.C.
 Martin Matte, M.S.C.
 Marc Messier, M.S.C.
 Céline Muloin, M.S.C.
 Jocelyn Paiement, M.S.C.
 Michael Paterson, M.S.C.
 Sarah Payne, M.S.C.
 Luke Glen Richardson, M.S.C.
 Stephanie Ann Richardson, M.S.C.
 The Honourable Murray Sinclair, M.S.C.
 Andrew Stawicki, M.S.C.
 Jean-François Stinco, M.S.C.
 Jean Teillet, M.S.C.
 Stanley Vollant, C.Q., M.S.C.
 Eric Wan, M.S.C.
 Marie Wilson, C.M., M.S.C.
 Eric Charles Windeler, M.S.C.

Second award of the Meritorious Service Medal (Military Division)
 Colonel James Andrew Irvine, M.S.M., C.D.
 Colonel Gregory Ronald Smith, M.S.M., C.D.

Meritorious Service Medal (Military Division)

 Major Joseph Michel Paul d’Orsonnens, M.S.M., C.D.
 Captain Jessica Harmon, M.S.M. (United States Army)
 Major Paul Douglas Hurley, M.S.M., C.D.
 Honorary Colonel John Keillor Farrer Irving, M.S.M.
 Major Wayne Christopher John Lindsay, M.S.M., C.D.
 Brigadier-General Derek Alan Macaulay, O.M.M., M.S.M., C.D.
 Chief Petty Officer 1st Class Andrew John Tiffin, M.M.M., M.S.M., C.D.
 Major Declan Ward, M.S.M., C.D.
 Colonel John James Alexander, M.S.M., C.D.
 Lieutenant-Colonel Tim Arsenault, M.S.M., C.D.
 Commander Pascal Belhumeur, M.S.M., C.D.
 Colonel Nicolas Pilon, M.S.M., C.D.
 Captain Darcy Dean Cyr, M.S.M., C.D.
 Lieutenant-General Roy Raymond Crabbe, C.M.M., M.S.C., M.S.M., C.D.
 Lieutenant-General Frederick Stanley Rudesheim, M.S.M. (United States Army)
 Captain(N) Frank Michael Knippel, M.S.M., C.D.
 Colonel Jesse Pearson, M.S.M. (United States Army)
 Commander Jason Scott Armstrong, M.S.M., C.D.
 Commander Trevor John Christopher MacLean, M.S.M., C.D.
 Chief Warrant Officer Emmett Gary Kelly, M.S.M., C.D.
 Master Corporal John Chaisson, M.S.M.
 Warrant Officer Michel Beliveau, M.S.M., C.D.
 Sergeant Jordan Kekoa Bourne, M.S.M., C.D.
 Brigadier-General François Joseph Chagnon, O.M.M., M.S.M., C.D.
 Master Seaman Kevin Hervé MacDonald, M.S.M.
 Colonel Joseph Robert François Malo, M.S.M., C.D.
 Brigadier-General Chad Thomas Manske, M.S.M. (United States Air Forces)
 Corporal Adam Savory, M.S.M.
 Sergeant Nicolaas Soulis, M.S.M., C.D.
 Lieutenant-Colonel Tammy Tremblay, M.S.M., C.D.

Meritorious Service Medal (Civil Division)

 Patricia S. Adachi, M.S.M.
 Christopher Joseph Alfano, M.S.M.
 Miles Leland Anderson, M.S.M.
 Sherilee Ann Anderson, M.S.M.
 Julian Armstrong, M.S.M.
 Gary Bailie, M.S.M.
 Nathalie Beaudry, M.S.M.
 Sharon L. Bieber, M.S.M.
 William F. Bieber, M.S.M.
 Stanley M. Diamond, M.S.M.
 Ruby Dunstan, M.S.M.
 Tina Fedeski, M.S.M.
 Paul E. Finkelstein, M.S.M.
 J. Barbara Finley, M.S.M.
 Georgette A. Fry, M.S.M.
 Andrew John Furey, M.S.M.
 Hy Goldman, M.S.M.
 Sandra Goldman, M.S.M.
 Ian Scott Graham, M.S.M.
 Stephen Robert Gregory, M.S.M.
 Les Hagen, M.S.M.
 Claire E. Hopkinson, M.S.M.
 Kenneth Hubbard, M.S.M.
 Hal Johnson, M.S.M.
 Jennifer Judith Jones, O.M., M.S.M.
 Tina Jean Keeper, O.M., M.S.M.
 Brigadier-general Vincent Wayne Kennedy, O.M.M., M.S.M., C.D. (retired)
 John J. Kish, M.S.M. (posthumous)
 Marilyn Y. Kish, M.S.M.
 Inspector Andrew Stefan Koczerzuk, M.S.M. (retired)
 Claudine Labelle, M.S.M.
 Michael Landsberg, M.S.M.
 Francine Laplante, M.S.M.
 Allen Large, M.S.M.
 Violet L. Large, M.S.M. (posthumous)
 Michel Jacques Bernard Le Baron, M.S.M.
 André Léon Lewis, M.S.M.
 Major-general Terrence Liston, M.S.M., C.D., M.B.E. (retired)
 James Paul Martin, M.S.M.
 Joanne McLeod, M.S.M.
 James Robert Michie, M.S.M.
 Jackoline Gail Milne, M.S.M.
 Brenda L. Montani, M.S.M.
 Patrick M. Montani, M.S.M.
 Valerie Lynne Nelson, M.S.M.
 Frances Noronha, O.Ont., M.S.M., M.B.E.
 Sherman Olson, M.S.M. (posthumous)
 Travis A. J. Price, M.S.M.
 James Raffan, M.S.M.
 Bilaal Rajan, M.S.M.
 Mary Margaret Richard, O.M., M.S.M. (posthumous)
 Jasmin Roy, M.S.M.
 Judy Servay, M.S.M.
 David J. Shepherd, M.S.M.
 William Shurniak, M.S.M.
 Narendra Chetram Singh, M.S.M.
 Dave C. Sopha, M.S.M.
 Mary Spencer, M.S.M.
 Gregory C. Van Tighem, M.S.M.
 Bruce R. Vanstone, M.S.M. (posthumous)
 Rebecca Anne Viau, M.S.M.
 Les H. Voakes, M.S.M.
 Michael Charles Ward, M.S.M.
 Captain William Hargen Wilson, O.M.M., A.O.E., M.S.M., C.D., R.C.N.

Secret appointments
 11 November 2017: His Excellency the Right Honourable David Johnston, Governor General and Commander-in-Chief of Canada, on the recommendation of the Chief of the Defence Staff, has awarded a Meritorious Service Cross and four Meritorious Service Medals to members of the Canadian Armed Forces for military activities of high standard that have brought great honour to the Canadian Armed Forces and to Canada. For security and operational reasons, the recipients’ names and citations have not been released.

Mentions in Dispatches
 Captain Andrew Paterson
 Master Corporal Mathieu Charette
 Master Corporal Sean Davis, C.D.
 Master Corporal Luke Matthew Hall
 Private Alexandre Lampron
 Sergeant David Eudor Leblanc, C.D.
 Private Mykel-Joey Lévesque
 Master Corporal Tyler James Latta
 Sergeant Jeffrey Spence, M.S.M., C.D.
 Major Victor Alexander de Waal, C.D.
 Master Corporal Shane Spencer Wilson, C.D.

Polar Medal

 Jill Heinerth
 Ann Maje Raider
 Darlene Scurvey

Commonwealth and Foreign Orders, Decorations and Medal awarded to Canadians

From Her Majesty The Queen in Right of the United Kingdom

Officer of the Most Excellent Order of the British Empire

 Mr. Danny Rimer

Member of the Most Excellent Order of the British Empire
 Mr. Imran Amed

From His Majesty The King of the Belgians

Commander of the Order of the Crown
 Dr. Roseann O’Reilly Runte
 Mr. Ronald Mock

From the President of the Republic of Colombia

“Faith in the Cause” Military Medal of the National Army 
 Major-General Denis William Thompson

From the President of the Federative Republic of Brazil

Grand Officer of the Order of Aeronautical Merit
 Lieutenant-General Michael John Hood

From the Queen of Denmark

Defence Medal for Exceptionally Meritorious Service
 Lieutenant-Colonel Brook Bangsboll

From the President of Finland

Knight of the Order of the White Rose, 1st Class
 Dr. Kevin R. E. McCormick

Commander of the Order of the Lion of Finland
 Mr. Stephen Timmons

From the President of the French Republic

Grand Officer of the National Order of the Legion of Honour

  Ms. Louise Beaudoin (This is a promotion within the Order)

Commander of the National Order of the Legion of Honour
 The Honourable Lawrence Cannon, 
 General Jonathan Holbert Vance,

Officer of the National Order of the Legion of Honour
 Mr. Michel Robitaille

Knight of the National Order of the Legion of Honour
 Mr. Guy Cormier
 Mr. Bruno Burnichon
 Lieutenant-Colonel Bruce Bolton, O.M.M., C.D.
 Mr. Denis Brière
 Mr. Michel Côté
 Mr. Louis Fortier
 Mr. Jean-Guy Paquet
 Mr. Michel Archambault
 Mr. Jacques Girard

Officer of the National Order of Merit 

 Mr. Gilbert Dekoker
 Lieutenant-General Guy Robert Thibault
 Vice-Admiral Ron Lloyd

Knight of the National Order of Merit
 Mr. Alain Aubut
 Mr. Edgard Caillier
 Mr. Roger Fontaine
 Ms. Danièle Henkel
 Ms. Mylène Paquette
 Mr. Wajdi Mouawad

Officer of the Order of the Academic Palms 

 Mr. Jacques-Paul Couturier
 Ms. Roseann O’Reilly Runte

Knight of the Order of the Academic Palms

 Ms. Ruby Heap
 Ms. Taghrid Abou Hassan
 Mr. Jocelyn Béland
 Ms. Sima Farsandaj
 Mr. Dominic Giroux
 Mr. Donald Ipperciel
 Ms. Nancy Mallet
 Mr. Pierre Riopel
 Mr. Marc Robichaud
 Ms. Suzanne Robichaud
 Mr. Robert Viau
 Mr. Michel Bergeron
 Mr. Gérard Boismenu
 Ms. Jo-Anne Doyon
 Mr. Christophe Guy
 Ms. Céline Marcoux-Hamade
 Mr. Michel Moisan
 Mr. Jean-Pierre Pichette

Commander of the Order of Arts and Letters

 Ms. Diane Dufresne
 Mr. Robert Charlebois
 Ms. Carole Laure
 Mr. Wajdi Mouawad

Officer of the Order of Arts and Letters
 Mr. Guy Berthiaume
 Mr. Joseph Rouleau
 Ms. Maidy Teitelbaum
 Ms. Anne Dorval
 Mr. Lewis Furey
 Ms. Ginnette Noiseux
 Mr. Gradimir Pankov
 Ms. Monique Simard

Knight of the Order of Arts and Letters
 Ms. Dawn Arnold
 Mr. Cameron Bailey
 Mr. Gaston Bellemare
 Ms. Clothilde Cardinal
 Ms. Louise Dery
 Mr. André Gaudreault
 Mr. Stéphan La Roche
 Ms. Suzanne Lebeau
 Mr. Louis Marchesano
 Ms. Monique Savoie
 Mr. Geoffrey Taylor
 Ms. Paulette Thériault
 Ms. Denise Filiatrault
 Mr. Louis Bélanger
 Ms. Isabelle Boulay
 Ms. Evelyne de la Chenelière
 Mr. Yan England
 Ms. Jacqueline Lyanga
 Mr. Ken Scott
 Ms. Ana Serrano
 Ms. Mary Stephen
 Mr. Theodore Ushev
 Ms. Gaëtane Verna

Officer of the Order of Maritime Merit 

 Mr. Jean d’Amour

Overseas Medal with “MALI” clasp 
 Lieutenant-Colonel Doris Gobeil

National Defence Medal, Gold Echelon with bronze star

to Lieutenant-Colonel Joseph Doris Gobeil

National Defense Medal, Gold Echelon 

 Colonel Guy Joseph Maillet
 Colonel Pierre Huet

National Defence Medal, Bronze Echelon

 Lieutenant-Commander Shawn E. Perry
 Colonel George James Petrolekas
 Commander Simon Brochu
 Major Pascale Lucie Marylène Morin

From the President of the Republic of Hungary

Officer’s Cross of the Order of Merit of Hungary (Civil Division)
 Dr. Peter Simon
 Mr. József Pungur

Knight’s Cross of the Order of Merit of Hungary (Civil Division)
 Ms. Anna Szenthe

Golden Cross of the Order of Merit of Hungary (Civil Division)
 Ms. Maria Roy

Golden Cross of Merit of Hungary (Civil Division)
 Ms. Gizella Hebein

Silver Cross of Merit of Hungary (Civil Division)
 Ms. Csilla Perényi

From the President of the Republic of Italy

Knight of the Order of the Star of Italy
 Mr. Lorenzo Bertuzzi

From His Majesty The Emperor of Japan

Order of the Rising Sun, Gold and Silver Star

to Mr. Joseph Caron

Order of the Rising Sun, Gold Rays with Neck Ribbon

 Mr. Arthur Kazumi Miki
 Mr. Mark James Surrette
 Mr. David Boyer Waterhouse

Order of the Rising Sun, Gold Rays with Rosette
 Ms. Noella Marie Gaudreault

Order of the Rising Sun, Gold and Silver Rays
 Mr. Wally Ursuliak
 Mr. Tetsuo Yoshida

From His Serene Highness The Prince of Monaco

Knight of the Order of Saint Charles

 Mr. Emmanuel Spanoudis

From the Secretary General of the North Atlantic Treaty Organization

NATO Meritorious Service Medal
 Lieutenant-Commander Jason Lacoursière
 Commander Mark Edward White

From the President of Pakistan

Medal of Excellence
 Mr. Naweed Imam Syed

From the President of the Republic of Poland

Commander’s Cross of the Order of Merit of the Republic of Poland
 Mr. Henry Lebioda
 The Honourable Lloyd Axworthy, P.C., C.C.
 The Honourable John Baird, P.C.
 Mr. Ted Opitz

Knight’s Cross of the Order of Merit of the Republic of Poland
 Mr. Andrzej Piotr Antoszkiewicz
 Ms. Marian Jaworski

Knight’s Cross of the Order of Polonia Restituta
 Mr. Kazimierz Pater

Cross of Freedom and Solidarity
 Ms. Maria Utracka
 Mr. Krzysztof Bialo

Siberian Exiles Cross
 Ms. Maria Bone
 Ms. Helena Kusiak
 Ms. Irene Wallace
 Mr. Stanislaw Wojtecki

Long Marital Life Medal

 Mrs. Janina Jekosz
 Mr. Stanislaw Jekosz

From the President of the Federation of Russia

Pushkin Medal
 Ms. Svetlana Roufanova

From the President of the Republic of Senegal

Commander of the National Order of the Lion
 Lieutenant-Colonel Joseph Guy Savard

From the President of Ukraine

Order of Merit, 3rd Class
 Mr. Ian Ihnatowycz

Ivan Mazepa Cross
 Mr. Taras Bahriy
 Mr. David Dutchak
 Mr. John Holuk
 Mrs. Olesia Luciw-Andrijowych
 Mrs. Renata Roman
 Mr. Orest Steciw

25th Anniversary of the Independence of Ukraine Medal
 Mr. Eugene Czolij
 Mr. Paul Grod
 Mr. Victor Hetmanczuk
 Ms. Ruslana Wrzesnewskyj

From the President of the United States of America

Officer of the Legion of Merit

 Brigadier-General David J. Anderson
 Colonel Jean-Yves Belzile
 Brigadier-General Joseph Hector Christian Drouin
 Brigadier-General Gregory R. Smith
 Brigadier-General Jean-Marc Lanthier 
 Brigadier-General William Francis Seymour

Second Award - Officer of the Legion of Merit
 Brigadier-General Jean-Marc Lanthier

Bronze Star Medal

 Brigadier-General Simon C. Hetherington
 Major Frank D. Lamie
 Major Matthew M. Tompkins

Defence Meritorious Service Medal

 Major Ian T. Grant
 Major Anthony Johnson
 Commander Edward C. King
 Lieutenant-Colonel Bruce MacLean
 Colonel Louis-Henri Rémillard
 Major Dragisa Ivkovic (deceased)
 Lieutenant-Colonel Louis-Benoit J. Dutil
 Lieutenant-Colonel Blair D. Ashford
 Colonel Eric Jean Kenny
 Captain Joseph P. McNulty

Meritorious Service Medal

 Major Kevin P. Barker
 Lieutenant-Commander Barrie Brett
 Chief Warrant Officer Martin Colbert
 Major Craig Derenzis
 Major Timothy G. Dwyre
 Captain Christopher T. Inglis
 Major Neil B. Marshall
 Lieutenant-Colonel Todd A. Murphy
 Commander Darren Rich
 Lieutenant-Colonel Cody Sherman
 Lieutenant-Colonel Donald Warren Smith
 Major Yanick J. Tardif
 Major Sharon A. Daley
 Major Steven L. Hewitt
 Lieutenant-Commander Roderick Macleod
 Lieutenant-Colonel Ryan M. M. Smith
 Lieutenant-Colonel John A. Van der Laan
 Captain Justin Behiels
 Lieutenant-Colonel Anthony Majintha Dejacolyn
 Major John Agusta Dempsey
 Major Leslie Joseph Philippe Ferris
 Lieutenant-Colonel Carla Harding
 Major Joseph André Benoit Mainville
 Major Bryce Marshall Morawiec
 Major Crystal Brook Morrison
 Lieutenant-Colonel Kevin Ng
 Captain Richard Andrew Havelock Nicholson
 Chief Warrant Officer Bryan Keith Pierce
 Major Germain Poirier
 Captain Leah Schutte
 Major Mark Hugh Smith
 Major Laurie Ann Bauer
 Lieutenant-Colonel Kenneth Freeman Butterworth
 Major Michael William Collacutt
 Major Timothy W. Day
 Lieutenant-Colonel Andrew B. Gault
 Major Neil Gregory
 Major Lucjan Grela
 Lieutenant-Colonel Stephen Theodorus Hanson
 Captain Guillaume Hébert
 Major Jill Hobson
 Major Jan-Peter A. Hoekstra
 Lieutenant-Commander Joel Kam
 Major Gordon James Albert Lemon
 Major Paul Edward Leonard
 Lieutenant-Colonel David Scott MacGregor
 Colonel William James McLean
 Major Trevor Kent Michelsen
 Major Michael Wade Moulton
 Colonel Damon Allan Perrault
 Captain Steven Pineau
 Lieutenant-Colonel Joseph Garry Pospolita
 Lieutenant-Colonel Ronald A. Puddister
 Lieutenant-Colonel Phillip Alastair Rennison
 Major Tanya Robertson
 Lieutenant-Commander Peter Francis Rohe
 Lieutenant-Commander Joseph Armand Clément Rouleau
 Captain Callum Thomas Smith
 Major Jeffrey Tebo
 Major Dorian P. Trenton
 Chief Warrant Officer Joseph Pascal Turcotte
 Major Neal O. Whitman
 Major Todd William Young
 Lieutenant-Colonel Darrel Chester Michael Zientek
 Major Christopher R. Boileau

Erratums of Commonwealth and Foreign Orders, Decorations and Medal awarded to Canadians

Corrected on 29 July 2019

From 26 December 2015
From the His Majesty The Emperor of Japan, the Order of the Rising Sun, Gold and Silver Rays to Mr. Martin Blake Kobayashi.

From 30 July 2016
From the President of Finland, Cross of Merit of the Order of the White Rose to Mr. Brian Vilho Koivu and Mr. Niilo Kustaa Saari.

From 04 February 2017
From the His Majesty The Emperor of Japan, Order of the Rising Sun, Gold Rays with Neck Ribbon, to Mr. Arthur Kazumi Miki.

From 24 June 2017
 From the His Majesty The Emperor of Japan, the Order of the Rising Sun, Gold and Silver Star to Mr. Joseph Caron. 
 From the His Majesty The Emperor of Japan, the Order of the Rising Sun, Gold Rays with Neck Ribbon to Mr. Mark James Surrette and Mr. David Boyer Waterhouse. 
 From the His Majesty The Emperor of Japan, the Order of the Rising Sun, Gold Rays with Rosette to Ms. Noella Marie Gaudreault.
 From the His Majesty The Emperor of Japan, the Order of the Rising Sun, Gold and Silver Rays to Mr. Wally Ursuliak.

Corrected on 26 August 2017

From 24 September 2016
From the President of the Republic of Austria, the gold medal for Services to the Republic of Austria to Mrs. Ernestine Tahedl

References 

Monarchy in Canada
2017 awards in Canada